Bělušice is a municipality and village in Most District in the Ústí nad Labem Region of the Czech Republic. It has about 200 inhabitants.

Administrative parts
Villages of Bedřichův Světec and Odolice are administrative parts of Bělušice.

Notable people
Count Václav Antonín Chotek of Chotkov and Vojnín (1674–1754), nobleman and politician

References

Villages in Most District